Booth is an unincorporated community in Autauga County, Alabama, United States. It was named after the Booth family. Booth lies along U.S. Route 82 8 mi (13 km) northwest of the city of Prattville, the county seat of Autauga County. US 82 also runs northwest 29 mi (47 km) to Maplesville.  It has a post office that was established in 1899.

Booth is part of the Montgomery Metropolitan Statistical Area.

References

Unincorporated communities in Autauga County, Alabama
Unincorporated communities in Alabama
Montgomery metropolitan area